The Allegheny Gators football program is a college football team that represents Allegheny College in the North Coast Athletic Conference, a part of the Division III (NCAA).  The team has had 35 head coaches since its first recorded football game in 1893. The current coach is Rich Nagy who first took the position for the 2019 season.

Key

Coaches

Notes

References

Allegheny Gators

Allegheny Gators football coaches